Ravipadu is a village in Nalgonda district formerly in Andhra Pradesh but since 2014 in Telangana, India. It falls under Bibinagar mandal.

References

Villages in Nalgonda district